Crisis Escape No. 1 is a 2005 South Korean television program. It aired on KBS 2TV on Monday at 20:55 from July 9, 2005 to April 11, 2016.

The shows aims to inform its viewers about how to overcome various crises that they may encounter in their lives, and claims they will make everyone experts at safety. It not only discusses crises such as natural disasters, it covers the topic of daily crises and how to avoid them, as well as overcoming them.

Previous hosts

References 

2005 South Korean television series debuts
2010s South Korean television series
Korean-language television shows
Korean Broadcasting System original programming
South Korean variety television shows